Zhang Boheng (born 4 March 2000) is a Chinese artistic gymnast. He competed at the 2021 Chinese Artistic Gymnastics Championships and won the all-around at the 2021 World Artistic Gymnastics Championships.

Career 

In 2015 he was named an Elite Athlete of National Class by the General Administration of Sport of China.

He represented Hunan at the 2021 Chinese Artistic Gymnastics Championships held in Chengdu, Sichuan. He finished 2nd  in the all-around final and first on Floor Exercise and was named to the Olympic training squad. He ended up being a reserve athlete at the 2020 Olympics.

At the 2021 World Artistic Gymnastics Championships he qualified in second place in the All-Around competition, Rings, and Parallel Bars. In the all-around final, he won the gold medal ahead of Japan’s Daiki Hashimoto and Ukraine’s Illia Kovtun. He is the fifth Chinese gymnast to win the men’s World all-around title.

Competitive history

Detailed Results

2017-2020 Code of Points

References

External links 
 

Living people
2000 births
Chinese male artistic gymnasts
World champion gymnasts
Medalists at the World Artistic Gymnastics Championships
21st-century Chinese people